"Alerus" may refer to:

Alerus Center, a large indoor arena and convention center in Grand Forks, North Dakota
Alerus Financial, a chain of financial institutions headquartered in Grand Forks, North Dakota